Route 53 is a state highway in Morris County in the U.S. state of New Jersey. It runs  from  U.S. Route 202 in Morris Plains north to Bloomfield Avenue in Denville Township. The route, which is a two-lane undivided highway most of its length, intersects with Route 10, Interstate 80, and U.S. Route 46. For most of its length, the route runs a short distance to the east of New Jersey Transit's Morristown Line. It passes through industrial areas and wooded residential neighborhoods along its route.

From 1916 to 1927, the route was a part of pre-1927 Route 5, which ran from Delaware in Warren County east to Newark. In 1927, the portion of pre-1927 Route 5 that is today Route 53 was not made a part of a different route and became Route 5N to distinguish it from a newly created Route 5. In 1953, the route became Route 53. A freeway was planned for the route in 1966, running from a planned Route 24 freeway in Morris Plains north to a planned Route 208 freeway in Greenwood Lake in Passaic County. This planned freeway was scaled back in 1967 to end at Interstate 80. It was later designated Route 178 before being canceled in 1975.

Route description

Route 53 begins at an intersection with U.S. Route 202 (Littleton Road) in Morris Plains. It proceeds north as Tabor Road, a two-lane undivided road closely paralleling New Jersey Transit’s Morristown Line, which runs along the west side of the route. Route 53 bends farther east from the tracks and runs through an industrial area. After passing through the industrial area, the road heads through wooded residential areas, passing under a set of power lines. Further north, Route 53 comes to an interchange with Route 10.

Past the Route 10 interchange, the road enters Parsippany-Troy Hills Township and continues north through wooded residential neighborhoods, running parallel to Interstate 80 (I-80) while passing to the east of a couple small lakes.  It begins to turn northwest before passing by the Mt. Tabor Country Club. Route 53 continues north through Mount Tabor before crossing into Denville Township, where the route becomes East Main Street. In Denville, the route passes under New Jersey Transit's Montclair-Boonton Line near Denville Station. Route 53 then comes to an interchange with I-80, where the route becomes a four-lane, divided highway. Immediately after I-80, the route interchanges with  U.S. Route 46 and ends at the intersection with Bloomfield Avenue.

History

What is now Route 53 was once part of a Lenape Trail running from Morristown to Denville. In 1916,  present-day Route 53 was designated as part of pre-1927 Route 5, which ran from Delaware in Warren County east to Newark. In the 1927 New Jersey state highway renumbering, this route became Route 6 (now U.S. Route 46) between Delaware and Denville, Route 32 (now U.S. Route 202) between Morris Plains and Morristown, and Route 24 (now Route 124) between Morristown and Newark. The portion of pre-1927 Route 5 between Morris Plains and Denville, however, was not replaced by a different route and became Route 5N to distinguish it from a newly created Route 5. The northern terminus of Route 5N was at U.S. Route 46/Route 6 (Bloomfield Avenue) in Denville; when those routes were moved to a bypass, Route 5N's northern terminus remained at Bloomfield Avenue. In the 1953 New Jersey state highway renumbering, Route 5N was renumbered to Route 53.

In 1966, a freeway was planned for the Route 53 corridor, intended to reduce traffic congestion. The freeway was intended to run from a planned Route 24 freeway in Morris Plains and continue north, crossing Interstate 80 and Route 23 before ending at a planned Route 208 freeway near Greenwood Lake in Passaic County that would connect to the New York State Route 208 freeway that was to continue north into Orange County, New York. In 1967, the northern terminus of the Route 53 freeway was cut back to Interstate 80. This freeway was designated Route 178 in 1969. Right-of-way acquisition began for the freeway but was stopped in 1971 due to lack of funds. The freeway was officially cancelled in 1975 when NJDOT did not include it in the five-year highway program. Despite the cancellation of the proposed freeway, several large corporations in Morris County pushed for the freeway to be built as it would reduce commuter traffic on Route 53 and US 202 in the area.

Major intersections

See also

References

External links

New Jersey Roads: Route 53
New Jersey Highway Ends: Route 53
Speed Limits for Route 53

053
Transportation in Morris County, New Jersey